Margot Bennett (19 January 1912 – 6 December 1980), born Margot Mitchell, was a Scottish-born screenwriter and author of crime and thriller novels.

Early life
Margot Mitchell (sometimes called Margot Miller) was born in Lenzie, Dunbartonshire, Scotland. She was educated in Scotland and in Australia.

Career 
Before publishing fiction, Bennett worked as an advertising copywriter in Sydney and London. During the Spanish Civil War, she worked as a nurse, translator, and broadcaster for the Spanish Medical Aid. During her war nursing work, she broke her arm when a truck overturned, and she was shot in both legs.

Bennett was a regular writer for Lilliput magazine between 1943 and 1950. She is best remembered for her crime fiction from the 1940s and 1950s, though she also wrote contemporary literature, thrillers and a science guide, The Intelligent Woman's Guide to Atomic Radiation (1964). She wrote two science fiction novels, one of which was The Long Way Back, about African colonization of Britain following a nuclear holocaust. Her novel The Man Who Didn't Fly was nominated for a Gold Dagger Award. In a 1962 review essay in The New York Times, Anthony Boucher counted Bennett among "the best Englishwomen in the suspense field," alongside Charity Blackstock, Nina Bawden, and Joan Fleming.

Bennett wrote scripts for television, including contributions to Maigret, Emergency-Ward 10, Market in Honey Lane and Quick Before They Catch Us. In early 1964, she was the second female writer to be associated with Doctor Who, though the historical story she was scheduled to contribute never went ahead. Bennett also wrote the screenplays for her books which were adapted for the screen.

Personal life 
During the Spanish Civil War, Margot Miller met Richard Lawrence Bennett (1912–1999), an English journalist and writer who had served in the Spanish Republican Army since 1936. During the conflict, he had written broadcasts for Radio Catalan. They were married in 19387 in Barcelona, the ceremony being conducted by a Republican soldier. They had three sons and a daughter. One of her sons, Rob, died from muscular dystrophy.

Bennett was a supporter of left-wing politics, including the Campaign for Nuclear Disarmament. Bennett lived in London in her later life. She died there in 1980, aged 68 years.

Bibliography

Novels

Short stories

Television Projects Contributed To

Screenplays
 The Man Who Liked Funerals (1959)
 The Crowning Touch (1959)

References

External links
Obituary, The Times, 6 December 1980

1912 births
1980 deaths
20th-century Scottish writers
Scottish crime fiction writers
People from Lenzie
Scottish science fiction writers
20th-century British novelists
Scottish women novelists
20th-century British women writers
Women mystery writers
British science fiction writers
Women science fiction and fantasy writers
20th-century Scottish women